Relay Graduate School of Education is a private graduate school for teachers in New York City and other cities across the nation. It was established in 2011 after being spun off from Hunter College's Teacher U program. It is the first stand-alone graduate school of education to open in New York since Bank Street College of Education was founded in 1916.

The New York Board of Regents approved the school unanimously with one abstention. Alternative certification programs such as Teach for America and the New York City Teaching Fellows utilize existing colleges for required coursework, while Relay GSE provides its own course program. Teacher U CEO Norman Atkins was chosen as the graduate school's president.

Teacher U was founded by three charter school networks "with impressive student achievement records": KIPP, Achievement First, and Uncommon Schools. The school will serve charter school and district teachers. There was opposition to the school's establishment from some of New York's existing universities that offer teacher education programs.

On September 7, 2013, Relay GSE held the commencement ceremony for its first graduating class of students on Pier 60 at Chelsea Piers in New York City.

The school has since expanded nationwide, with additional campuses in Atlanta, Baton Rouge, Chicago, Connecticut, Delaware, Denver, Houston, Memphis, Nashville, New Orleans, Newark, Philadelphia, Camden, and San Antonio.

References

External links

Schools of education in New York (state)
Educational institutions established in 2011
2011 establishments in New York City